Bascanichthys fijiensis is an eel in the family Ophichthidae (worm/snake eels). It was described by Alvin Seale in 1935. It is a tropical, marine eel which is known from Fiji (from which its species epithet is derived), in the western central Pacific Ocean.

References

Ophichthidae
Fish described in 1935